At least three French ships have borne the name Pasteur:

 , a  commissioned in 1932 and scuttled in 1940
 , a passenger liner launched in 1938
 , a passenger liner launched in 1966

See also

French Navy ship names